Sue Johnson  is a British clinical psychologist, couples therapist and author living and working in Canada. She is known for her work in the field of psychology on bonding, attachment and adult romantic relationships.

Career 
Johnson earned a B.A. in English Literature from the University of Hull in 1968, and an Ed.D. in Counselling Psychology from the University of British Columbia in 1984. She currently holds the title of Emeritus Professor in the Department of Psychology at the University of Ottawa. Along with Les Greenberg, Johnson developed emotionally focused couples and family therapy (EFT), a psychotherapeutic approach for couples based on attachment theory. She founded the International Centre for Excellence in Emotionally Focused Therapy, which offers training in EFT to mental health professionals.

Johnson has authored a number of books for therapists (including EFT treatment manuals) and for general audiences. 

In 2016, Johnson was named Family Psychologist of the Year by the American Psychological Association's Society for Couple and Family Psychology. In 2017, she was appointed a Member of the Order of Canada.

Selected works

Books 

Johnson, S.M. (2019) Attachment Theory in Practice: Emotionally Focused Therapy (EFT) With Individuals, Couples, and Families. New York: Guilford Press 
Johnson, S.M.; Sanderfer, K. (2016) Created for Connection: The "Hold Me Tight" Guide for Christian Couples. New York: Little Brown 
Johnson, S.M. (2013) Love Sense: The Revolutionary Science of Romantic Relationships. New York: Little Brown 
Johnson, S.M. (2008) Hold Me Tight: Seven Conversations for a Lifetime of Love. New York: Little Brown  
 Johnson, S.M. (2007). Practica de la Terapia Matrimonial Concentrada Emocionalmente: Creando Conexiones New York: Routledge, Taylor & Francis Group – Spanish Edition.
Johnson, S.M., Bradley, B., Furrow, J., Lee, A., Palmer, G., Tilley, D. & Woolley, S.(2005)  Becoming an Emotionally Focused Therapist: The Workbook. New York: Brunner /Routledge.
Johnson, S.M. (2002) Emotionally Focused Couple Therapy with Trauma Survivors: Strengthening Attachment Bonds. New York: Guilford Press.
Johnson, S.M. (1996) (2004 -2nd edition).  Creating Connection:  The Practice of Emotionally Focused Marital Therapy.  New York:  Brunner/Mazel (now Brunner /Routledge).
Saxe, B. J., Johnson, S.M. et al. (1994)  From victim to survivor: A group treatment model for women survivors of incest.  Government of Canada:  Health Department.  Distributed across Canada in French and English, pp. 1–188.
Greenberg, L. & Johnson, S.M. (1988)  Emotionally Focused Therapy for Couples. New York: Guilford Press.

Articles 
 Johnson, S.M. (2008). "My, How Couples Therapy Has Changed!: Attachment, Love and Science."

References

Canadian psychologists
Canadian psychotherapists
Canadian women psychologists
Academic staff of the University of Ottawa
Living people
Year of birth missing (living people)
Place of birth missing (living people)
People from Chatham, Kent
Alumni of the University of Hull
University of British Columbia alumni
Canadian women non-fiction writers
21st-century Canadian women writers
20th-century Canadian women writers
21st-century Canadian non-fiction writers
20th-century Canadian non-fiction writers
Members of the Order of Canada